John Brand Schneider from the Washington State University, Pullman, WA was named Fellow of the Institute of Electrical and Electronics Engineers (IEEE) in 2013 for contributions to the finite-difference time-domain method in computational electromagnetics.

References 

Fellow Members of the IEEE
Living people
Washington State University faculty
21st-century American engineers
Washington State University alumni
Tulane University alumni
Year of birth missing (living people)
American electrical engineers